Monochamus dubius is a species of beetle in the family Cerambycidae. It was described by Charles Joseph Gahan in 1894. It is known from India, Thailand, Myanmar, Vietnam, Taiwan, and China.

Varietas
 Monochamus dubius var. luteovittatus Breuning, 1944
 Monochamus dubius var. sparsenotatus Pic, 1920

References

dubius
Beetles described in 1894
Taxa named by Charles Joseph Gahan